The Brazilian Congressional Bill project No. 1151, authored by former congresswoman Marta Suplicy, from the Workers' Party of São Paulo, aims to change Brazilian federal law in order to establish same-sex civil unions. Specifically, it aims to amend Article 1723 of the Civil Code to define a civil union as between two unmarried individuals regardless of either partner's gender.

History
The bill had been pending in the Chamber of Deputies since 1995 and was the theme of the 2005 São Paulo Gay Pride Parade. It has been debated many times, but has never been brought to a vote. Then-President of the Chamber Severino Cavalcanti was expected to end debate and bring the bill to a vote in late 2005, but corruption charges forced his resignation. Despite the anticipated vote, Calvalcanti strongly opposed the bill.

In 2012, the bill was introduced into the Senate by Suplicy, who was elected in 2011 to a seat in the Senate. On May 24, 2012, it was passed by the Senate's human rights committee. It will face another vote before the Senate's Committee on Constitution, Justice and Citizenship, with a subsequent vote in the Chamber of Deputies if no action is taken by the plenary of the Senate. The bill's chances for a full congressional vote have been heightened since the Brazilian Supreme Court ruled in ADI 4277 and ADPF 132 (May 2011) that civil unions should be allowed for same-sex couples.

See also 
 Same-sex marriage in Brazil
 LGBT rights in Brazil
 Marriage, unions and partnerships by country
 LGBT rights by country or territory
 Timeline of LGBT history

External links
  — Full text of Bill Project 1151 (Unofficial Translation)

References

Same-sex marriage in Brazil
Brazil
LGBT rights in Brazil